South Hazelton is an unincorporated community along the Skeena River in northwestern British Columbia, Canada.

References 

Designated places in British Columbia
Unincorporated settlements in British Columbia
Populated places in the Regional District of Kitimat–Stikine
Skeena Country